Andrew Peter Harris (born January 25, 1957) is an American politician and physician serving as the U.S. representative for  since 2011. The district includes the entire Eastern Shore, as well as several eastern exurbs of Baltimore. He is the only Republican member of Maryland's congressional delegation. Harris previously served in the Maryland Senate.

Early life, education, and career
Harris's father was Zoltán Harris, an anesthesiologist who was born in Miskolc, Hungary, in 1911 and emigrated to the U.S. in 1950; his mother, Irene (Koczerzuk), was born in Zarice, Poland. Harris was born in New York, grew up in Queens, and attended Regis High School in Manhattan.

Harris earned his BS in biology (1977) and his MD (1980) from Johns Hopkins University. The university's Bloomberg School of Hygiene and Public Health conferred his MHS in 1995 in health policy and management and health finance and management.

Harris served in the Navy Medical Corps and the U.S. Naval Reserve as a lieutenant commander on active duty during Operation Desert Storm. He previously worked as an anesthesiologist, an associate professor of anesthesiology and critical care medicine, and as chief of obstetric anesthesiology at the Johns Hopkins Hospital. Harris also served as commanding officer for the Johns Hopkins Naval Reserve Medical Unit from 1989 to 1992.

Maryland General Assembly
Harris was first elected to the Maryland Senate in 1998 for District 9, including part of Baltimore County. He defeated his predecessor, Minority Leader F. Vernon Boozer, in the 1998 primary election. A major factor in the race was Boozer's role in derailing an attempt to ban partial-birth abortion a year earlier; the bill's sponsor, fellow state senator Larry Haines, supported Harris's primary bid. In the general election he defeated Democratic nominee Anthony O. Blades.

Harris's district was later redrawn to be District 7, representing parts of Harford County, succeeding Norman Stone. He defeated Democratic nominee Diane DeCarlo in the general election in 2002, and from 2003 to 2006 served as the minority whip. He was reelected in 2006, defeating Patricia A. Foerster. He was succeeded by J. B. Jennings.

U.S. House of Representatives

Elections

2008

Harris defeated incumbent Republican Wayne Gilchrest and State Senator E. J. Pipkin in the Republican primary for Maryland's 1st congressional district. Harris ran to the right of Gilchrest, a moderate Republican. He explained that he was upset with Gilchrest's decision to support a Democrat-sponsored bill setting a timetable for troop withdrawal from Iraq and suspected that many of his constituents also felt that way. He was endorsed by the Club for Growth, which raised nearly $250,000 for him, former governor Bob Ehrlich, seven of 10 state senators who represent parts of the district, and House Minority Leader Anthony O'Donnell. His general election opponent, Frank Kratovil, criticized the Club for Growth's policies, and Harris for having its support. Gilchrest endorsed Kratovil.

On paper, Harris had a strong advantage in the general election due to its Republican lean. Although Democrats and Republicans are nearly tied in registration, the district has a strong tinge of social conservatism that favors Republicans. It had been in Republican hands for all but 14 years since 1947, although Kratovil received a significant boost when Gilchrest endorsed him.

On election night, Kratovil led Harris by 915 votes. After two rounds of counting absentee ballots, Kratovil's lead grew to 2,000 votes. Forecasting that there was little chance for Harris to close the gap, most media outlets declared Kratovil the winner on the night of November 7. Harris conceded on November 11.

Harris dominated his longtime base in Baltimore's heavily Republican eastern suburbs, which account for most of the district's share of Baltimore County, but failed to carry a single county on the Eastern Shore.

He is a member of the Freedom Caucus.

2010

Harris ran again in the 1st District in 2010. He defeated Rob Fisher, a conservative businessman, in the primary.

Harris's primary win set up a rematch against Kratovil. Libertarian Richard James Davis and Independent Jack Wilson also ran. In the November 2 general election, Harris defeated Kratovil by 14%.

2012

The National Journal's Cook Political Report named Harris one of the top 10 Republicans most vulnerable to redistricting in 2012, noting that Maryland Democrats could redraw Harris's home in Cockeysville out of the 1st. Instead, Roscoe Bartlett's 6th District was redrawn. Some of Bartlett's shares of Harford, Baltimore, and Carroll counties were drawn into the 1st, making this already strongly Republican district even more so.

Harris was reelected, defeating Democratic nominee Wendy Rosen with 67% of the vote. Rosen withdrew from the race after being confronted with evidence that she had voted in both Maryland and Florida in the 2006 and 2008 elections. Rosen had property in Florida, and Maryland law allowed property owners to vote in local elections even if they live elsewhere. But her Florida voting registration reportedly also gave her access to state and federal elections there, which was prohibited by Maryland law. At the time Rosen withdrew, ballots had already been printed. John LaFerla, who had narrowly lost to Rosen in the primary, was endorsed as Rosen's replacement, but could only be a write-in.

2014

Harris defeated Democratic nominee Bill Tilghman with over 70% of the vote.

2016

Harris won the Republican primary, defeating three challengers with 78.4% of the vote. Former Maryland state delegate Mike Smigiel came in second place with 10.8%. Smigiel ran because he opposed Harris's strident opposition to marijuana decriminalization in the District of Columbia.

In the general election, Harris won another term with 229,135 votes (67.8%), defeating Democratic nominee Joe Werner, a "little-known Harford County attorney and perennial candidate" who received 94,776 votes (28%). Libertarian candidate Matt Beers received 14,207 votes (4.2%). In February 2016, Harris was the first congressman to endorse Ben Carson for the Republican nomination for president. Carson dropped out two weeks later after a poor performance in the Super Tuesday March 1 primaries.

2018

While Harris was running for reelection, the Maryland Democratic Party accused him of ethics violations, alleging that he might have violated ethics rules requiring members to report the source of spousal income and assets. In response, the Harris campaign said the omission was a mistake, and Harris amended his filing once he became aware of the error.

In the general election, Harris defeated Democratic nominee Jesse Colvin with 60% of the vote.

2020

Harris defeated Democratic nominee Mia Mason with over 63% of the vote.

2022

Harris was reelected with 54.4% of the vote. , Maryland's congressional maps had not been finalized. A judge tossed out the state's new maps, calling the redistricted maps an "extreme partisan gerrymander" by Democrats. The rejected maps gave Democrats an advantage over Republicans in all eight of the state's congressional districts.

Committee assignments
Committee on Transportation and Infrastructure
Subcommittee on Coast Guard & Maritime Transportation
Subcommittee on highways and transit
Subcommittee on water resources & Environment

In October 2015, Harris was named to serve on the Select Investigative Panel on Planned Parenthood.

Caucus memberships 

 Freedom Caucus

Political positions

Affordable Care Act
Harris opposes the Affordable Care Act and has voted to repeal it.

Debt ceiling
On October 16, 2013, Harris voted against the motion to end the government shutdown and raise the debt ceiling.

2020 presidential election
After Joe Biden won the 2020 presidential election and President Donald Trump refused to concede while making false claims of fraud, Harris defended Trump's efforts to overturn the election. Harris falsely claimed there were "large-scale voting irregularities" and "secret, unobserved vote counting in the swing states."

In December 2020, Harris was one of 126 Republican members of the House of Representatives to sign an amicus brief in support of Texas v. Pennsylvania, a lawsuit filed at the United States Supreme Court contesting the results of the 2020 presidential election. The Supreme Court declined to hear the case on the basis that Texas lacked standing under Article III of the Constitution to challenge the results of an election held by another state.

Storming of the Capitol
In an interview with WBAL-TV just after evacuating the Capitol after it was stormed, Harris downplayed the violence of the riot, saying "Obviously, later we heard there was a gunshot, but other than that, there was no indication that this was a truly violent protest, as violent as one as you would worry about." Harris also said he understood the rioters' frustrations and repeated false claims of election fraud.

On January 6, 2021, after the 2021 storming of the United States Capitol, Harris had a verbal altercation with Representative Al Lawson on the House floor after taking offense at Representative Conor Lamb's criticism of House Republicans for pushing unfounded conspiracy theories. During an interview the next day, Harris falsely claimed that leftist provocateurs were behind the storming of the Capitol.

In June 2021, Harris was among 21 House Republicans to vote against a resolution to give the Congressional Gold Medal to police officers who defended the U.S. Capitol on January 6.

Marijuana
In 2014, Harris was the leading congressional critic of marijuana decriminalization in the District of Columbia bill, and led efforts in Congress to block decriminalization from taking effect. Harris's amendment led to a call from D.C. Mayor Vincent Gray to boycott tourism to Harris's district and the boycott of Maryland's 1st congressional district, as well as an online campaign requesting that D.C.-area businesses refuse him service. Washington D.C. officials and marijuana activists called Harris's actions unwarranted congressional interference.

In November 2014, D.C. residents voted to legalize recreational cannabis for adults, with 68% in favor. Despite this, Harris said he would use "all resources available to a member of Congress to stop this action". On December 9, 2014, congressional leaders announced a deal on a spending bill that included language that would prohibit the D.C. referendum from taking effect. Harris said that "the Constitution gives Congress the ultimate oversight about what happens in the federal district." He said he believes that cannabis is a gateway drug.

In 2022, Harris added a provision to the $1.5 trillion spending omnibus package that barred D.C. from legalizing, regulating and taxing the sale recreational cannabis, overriding the will of D.C. voters. Democrats opposed Harris's provision, but Republicans sharply opposed attempts to remove the provision.

LGBT rights 
In 2015, Harris cosponsored a resolution to amend the US constitution to ban same-sex marriage. He also cosponsored a resolution disagreeing with the Supreme Court ruling in Obergefell v. Hodges, which held that same-sex marriage bans violate the constitution.

Roy Moore
During the primary race of the 2017 special election to fill the Senate seat formerly held by Jeff Sessions, Harris endorsed Roy Moore in his primary campaign against the incumbent, Luther Strange. Following the news of sexual misconduct allegations against Moore, Harris said Moore should withdraw from the race if the allegations were true.

COVID-19 response
Harris opposed stay-at-home orders in response to the COVID-19 pandemic. On May 2, 2020, he addressed protesters in Salisbury attempting to pressure Maryland governor Larry Hogan to lift restrictions, saying, "I am a physician. Let me tell you something: It is safe to begin to reopen Maryland."

Harris opposed prohibitions on indoor dining during the COVID-19 pandemic.

Impeachments
On October 31, 2019, Harris voted with his fellow Republicans in opposition to a resolution outlining rules for then-ongoing impeachment inquiry against Donald Trump. On December 18, 2019, he voted against both articles of impeachment of the first impeachment of President Trump.

Harris was one of four representatives who did not cast a vote regarding the second impeachment of President Trump on January 13, 2021. He tweeted that he opposed it, calling it divisive and a waste of time, and that he needed to be in the operating room caring for patients. During the 117th United States Congress, Harris co-sponsored two different resolutions to impeach President Joe Biden. He also cosponsored a resolutions to impeach Attorney General Merrick Garland and Secretary of State Antony Blinken. Very early in the 118th Congress, Harris cosponsored a resolution to impeach Secretary of Homeland Security Alejandro Mayorkas.

Foreign policy
In 2021, Harris was one of 14 Republican representatives to vote against a measure condemning the Myanmar coup d'état.

In 2023, Harris was among 47 Republicans to vote in favor of H.Con.Res. 21 which directed President Joe Biden to remove U.S. troops from Syria within 180 days.

Electoral history

Personal life
Harris was married for 30 years to Sylvia "Cookie" Harris, who died of a heart attack on August 28, 2014. They had five children. In July 2017, he married Nicole Beus, a Baltimore County political and marketing consultant who serves as the chair of the Maryland Republican Party.

Harris resides in Cockeysville, Maryland, and considered himself a "citizen-legislator," having maintained his medical practice while in the State Senate.
 
Harris has been an active member in the community as a member of the Knights of Columbus, an officer in the Thornleigh Neighborhood Improvement Association (vice president, 1984–85; president, 1985–86), a member of the Board of Directors of the Sherwood Community Association (1987–91), and vice president of St. Joseph's School Home-School Association from 1992 to 1994. He also served on the Board of Directors of the Maryland Leadership Council (1995–98), as a member of the North Central Republican Club (treasurer, 1997–98; vice president, 1998), and as a delegate to the 2004 Republican Party National Convention. Harris received the Dr. Henry P. and M. Page Laughlin Distinguished Public Officer Award from the Medical and Chirurgical Faculty of Maryland in 2001.

2021 gun incident
On January 21, 2021, Harris tried to enter the House floor with a gun, setting off a metal detector. This was in violation of new security measures adopted after the storming of the U.S. Capitol. Harris was not allowed to enter and returned 10 minutes later without a gun, at which point he was allowed entry. U.S. Capitol Police began an investigation into the incident.

Ivermectin prescriptions
In October 2021, Harris said on a radio show he prescribed ivermectin to constituents for treatment of COVID-19. Ivermectin is used to treat parasites in livestock and river blindness in humans. It is not approved by the FDA for treatment of COVID-19. During a discussion of vaccine mandates by the House Freedom Caucus in November 2021, Harris said that a complaint was filed against him with a physicians board for prescribing ivermectin.

See also
 Physicians in the United States Congress

References

External links

 Congressman Andy Harris official U.S. House website
 Andy Harris for Congress
 
 
 

|-

|-

|-

1957 births
Living people
21st-century American politicians
American anesthesiologists
United States Navy personnel of the Gulf War
American Roman Catholics
American nationalists
American people of Hungarian descent
American politicians of Polish descent
Cannabis prohibition
Johns Hopkins Hospital physicians
Johns Hopkins University alumni
Johns Hopkins University faculty
Republican Party Maryland state senators
Military personnel from Maryland
Military personnel from New York (state)
People from Baltimore County, Maryland
People from Queens, New York
Regis High School (New York City) alumni
Republican Party members of the United States House of Representatives from Maryland
United States Navy Medical Corps officers
United States Navy reservists
American Catholics
Catholics from Maryland
Right-wing populism in the United States
Physicians from Maryland